Pål Thowsen (born 15 July 1955) is a Norwegian jazz drummer. He has released several solo albums and received two Spellemannprisen awards.

Career 
Thowsen was born in Lillestrøm, and started his career in the early 1970s as a musician in Arild Andersen's quartet, finding international success throughout the decade. At the same time he was a member of the jazz rock band Moose Loose. In 1973 he collaborated for the first time with jazz guitarist Jon Eberson, a collaboration that has lasted throughout his career in various groups, and has recorded about ten albums with Ketil Bjørnstad. Other musicians he has worked with include Radka Toneff, Terje Rypdal, Palle Mikkelborg, Odd Riisnæs and Dag Arnesen and a member of the Jazzpunkensemblet, the Net, Halle / Eberson / Thowsen / Kjellemyr, Ole Paus and Finn Kalvik, Sinikka Langeland and Metropolitan.

Thowsen, along with Jon Christensen, won the 1977 Spellmanprisen for jazz album for the album No Time for Time, and the 1979 Spellmanprisen for jazz album for his album Surprise.

Selected discography 
No Time for Time (1976) (with Jon Christensen)
Surprise (1979)
Carnival (1981)
Sympathy (1983)
Call Me Stranger (1986) (with Tor Endresen)
Life Goes On (1988) (with Tor Endresen)
Collection (1992)
...The Rest Is Rumors (2002)

References

External links 
 
 Biography from the Norwegian Jazz Archives

1955 births
Living people
Norwegian jazz composers
20th-century Norwegian drummers
21st-century Norwegian drummers
Norwegian jazz drummers
Male drummers
Norwegian percussionists
People from Skedsmo
Musicians from Lillestrøm
Spellemannprisen winners
Taurus Records artists
20th-century drummers
Male jazz composers
20th-century Norwegian male musicians
21st-century Norwegian male musicians
Jazzpunkensemblet members